Akossi Gnalo (born 22 February 1960) is a Togolese sprinter. He competed in the men's 400 metres at the 1988 Summer Olympics.

References

External links
 

1960 births
Living people
Athletes (track and field) at the 1988 Summer Olympics
Togolese male sprinters
Olympic athletes of Togo
Place of birth missing (living people)
21st-century Togolese people